Taguhi Tovmasyan (born 14 August 1982, Vardenis, Armenian SSR, USSR) Deputy of the 7th convocation of the National Assembly of Armenia, Guide-translator (English), journalist, politician.

Biography 
Tovmasyan was born August 1982 in Vardenis.

She studied at the Faculty of Humanities at the Armenian State Pedagogical University from where she graduated as an English guide translator in 2000 and a journalist in 2003. In 2013, she graduated with a MSc in political science from the Armenian Academy of Public Administration. She followed up on her studies in journalism in international standards of journalism at the Institute for War en Peace Reporting in Yerevan in 2004, and in a program on juridical journalism from the Association of European Journalists. In 2014-2015 she participated in Democracy courses organized in Yerevan by the Council of Europe.

Professional career 
Between 2003 and 2004 she was a volunteer at the “Iravunk newspaper” in which in 2004 she was promoted to the political department of the newspaper.

2004 - 2007 - Journalist of the political department of the “Iravunk” newspaper. 2007- 2011 - Journalist of the newspaper “The Fourth Power” of the LLC agency “Ogostos” (“August”).

In 2011- she was the founding head of the  “Zhoghovurd Publishing House LLC” (“Zhoghovurd” daily newspaper, ArmLur.am news site). She was also the Editor-in-Chief of “Zhoghovurd” newspaper and ArmLur.am website.The publishing house was raided in December 2019.

Political career 
2019 - 2021- Member of the National Assembly (territorial electoral list of the electoral district #8 of the “My Step” alliance of parties). On November 16, 2020, in protest of the defeat in the Second Nagorno Karabakh war, she left the faction of the National Assembly "My Step". Following she joined the I have Honor alliance (Pativ Unem) who nominated her to the parliamentarian Human Rights commission. 

On 31 March 2021 at the 11th annual AAD Award Ceremony, she received nomination “Best Parliament Member of the Year” for the Deputy activity in 2020. 

June 20, 2021 - Elected Member of the National Assembly from the national electoral list of the “With Honor” alliance of parties.

Family 
She is married and has two children.

References

See also 

 List of members of the seventh National Assembly of Armenia

Living people
1982 births
21st-century Armenian politicians
21st-century Armenian women politicians
Members of the 7th convocation of the National Assembly (Armenia)
Armenian State Pedagogical University alumni